Jack Grant (born 24 January 1994 in Australia) is an Australian rugby union player who plays for the  in Super Rugby. His playing position is scrum-half. He was named in the Waratahs squad for the 2021 Super Rugby AU season.

Reference list

External links
Rugby.com.au profile
Main itsrugby.co.uk profile
Other itsrugby.co.uk profile with incorrect dates but some games played

1994 births
Australian rugby union players
Living people
Rugby union scrum-halves
Sydney (NRC team) players
New South Wales Country Eagles players
NTT DoCoMo Red Hurricanes Osaka players
New South Wales Waratahs players
Ealing Trailfinders Rugby Club players